Vila Shahr (also Romanized as Vīlā Shahr) is a village in Torqabeh Rural District, Torqabeh District, Torqabeh and Shandiz County, Razavi Khorasan Province, Iran. At the 2006 census, its population was 1,499, in 381 families.

References 

Populated places in Torqabeh and Shandiz County